WBW may refer to:

Wait But Why, an American blog
Wilkes-Barre Wyoming Valley Airport, an IATA code for a regional airport in Wilkes-Barre, Pennsylvania
Womyn-born womyn, women who were assigned female at birth and raised as females
World Breastfeeding Week, worldwide annual celebration
WWAY-DT2, formerly WBW, American television station